Sadaka Sporting Club is a multi-sports club based in Beirut, Lebanon. The club has consisted of various departments throughout their history, including handball, futsal, women's football, and kung fu.

Sadaka's women's football department began in 2008 as one of the first women's teams in Lebanon, winning the first seven league titles, as well as the first six FA Cups. They withdrew their team prior to the 2014–15 season.

Honours

Men's futsal 
 Lebanese Futsal League
 Winners (2): 2010–11, 2012–13

Women's football
Lebanese Women's Football League
Winners (7; record): 2007–08, 2008–09, 2009–10, 2010–11, 2011–12, 2012–13, 2013–14
Lebanese Women's FA Cup
Winners (6; record): 2007–08, 2008–09, 2009–10, 2010–11, 2011–12, 2012–13

See also
Women's football in Lebanon

References

 
Sport in Beirut
1995 establishments in Lebanon
Women's football clubs in Lebanon
Defunct football clubs in Lebanon
Association football clubs established in 2008
Association football clubs disestablished in 2013
Futsal clubs in Lebanon
Handball clubs established in 1996